The Ministry for Naval Affairs was a government department of Greece responsible for matters pertaining to the Greek Navy as well as the Greek Merchant Marine Ministry.

The ministry was established in 1822, when the Provisional Administration of Greece was formed following the start of the Greek War of Independence, with the name Ministry for Naval Affairs (Μινιστέριον των Ναυτικών). After the reorganization of the government under Ioannis Kapodistrias, and in the early years of King Otto's rule, it was known as the Secretariat of State for Naval Affairs (Γραμματεία τῆς Ἐπικρατείας ἐπὶ τῶν Ναυτικῶν), but after 1843 it was renamed to its eventual name (Ὑπουργείον ἐπὶ τῶν Ναυτικῶν, later simplified Ὑπουργείον τῶν Ναυτικῶν).

In 1936, the merchant marine section was split off to form an independent Merchant Marine Ministry, and the Ministry for Naval Affairs retained only its military responsibilities. In 1950, the Nikolaos Plastiras government established the Ministry of National Defence, to which the Ministry for Naval Affairs was subordinated as a Sub-Ministry (Ὑφυπουργείον τῶν Ναυτικῶν) until 1953, when the Alexandros Papagos government abolished the position.

List of ministers

References

1822 establishments in Greece
1950 disestablishments in Greece
Defunct government ministries of Greece
Greece
Hellenic Navy
Greek Merchant Marine
Naval history of Greece